Antichloris ornata is a moth of the family Erebidae. It was described by Herbert Druce in 1883. It is found in Ecuador, Bolivia and Colombia.

References

Moths described in 1883
Euchromiina
Moths of South America